Susan Hankinson is an American cancer researcher who is the Distinguished Professor of Epidemiology at the University of Massachusetts Amherst. Her research considers cancer epidemiology and the etiology of breast cancer. Her work has demonstrated the relationship between hormones and breast cancer risk. In 2023, she was awarded the American Association for Cancer Research Award for Research Excellence in Cancer Epidemiology and Prevention.

Early life and education 
Hankinson studied nursing at the University of Maine. After earning her bachelor's degree, she moved to the University of Minnesota, where she earned a master's degree in environmental health. In Minnesota, she earned a Masters of Public Health, before moving to Harvard University to complete a Doctor of Science. Her doctoral research looked at the environmental determinants of cataracts.

Research and career 
Hankinson is an expert in cancer epidemiology and the use of biomarkers in epidemiological studies. She looks to develop more sophisticated prediction models for breast cancer diagnoses that helps women better understand their risk. She created a breast cancer biomarker discovery program that demonstrated the association between hormones, lifestyle factors, and cancer risk. Her research demonstrated that women who used hormone replacement therapy were more likely to suffer from breast cancer than women who did not, and that the risk was highest amongst women who used a progestin–oestrogen combination therapy. The increased risk associated with hormone replacement therapy depended on body mass index; women with a body mass index below 25 were most at risk.

From 2006 to 2010, Hankinson was Principal Investigator of the Nurses' Health Study, where, in a trial of over 200,000 people, she investigated how lifestyle (dietary intake, obesity) and hormones impact cancer risk. Her research showed that people who work night shifts experience a greater cancer risk. She joined the University of Massachusetts Amherst in 2011.

Hankinson has also studied the relationship between chronic stress and heart disease. To do this, she studied metabolites in blood samples using mass spectrometry.

Hankinson received the 2020 American Association for Cancer Research Distinguished Lectureship in Breast Cancer Research award, and was named by research.com as the 28th most highly cited women scientist in the world by research in 2022. In 2023, she was awarded the American Association for Cancer Research award for Excellence in Cancer Epidemiology and Prevention.

Selected publications

References 

University of Maine alumni
University of Minnesota School of Public Health alumni
Harvard School of Public Health alumni
University of Massachusetts Amherst faculty
Cancer researchers
American medical researchers
Women medical researchers
Year of birth missing (living people)
Living people
20th-century American scientists
20th-century American women scientists
21st-century American scientists
21st-century American women scientists